The 2018–19 Boston College Eagles men's ice hockey team represented Boston College in the 2018–19 NCAA Division I men's ice hockey season. The team was coached by Jerry York, '67, his twenty-fifth season behind the bench at Boston College. The Eagles played their home games at Kelley Rink on the campus of Boston College, competing in Hockey East.

The Eagles competed in just one mid-season tournament during the 2018–19 season, forgoing the traditional holiday break tournament. The Eagles played in the 67th Annual Beanpot Tournament at the TD Garden in Boston, Massachusetts, on February 4 and 11. Boston College defeated Harvard in the opening round by a score of 2–1, but fell to the defending champion Northeastern Huskies in the championship game, 4–2. The Eagles failed to secure the Beanpot title, but ended their two-season streak of finishing fourth in the tournament.

The Eagles finished the season 14–22–3, and 10-11-3 in conference play, seventh in Hockey East; their lowest finish since placing 6th in 2008–09. They advanced to the title game of the Hockey East tournament, however, they fell to the Northeastern Huskies by a score of 3–2. The Eagles failed to secure a bid to the NCAA Tournament, their third consecutive season missing the national tournament.

Previous season recap
The Eagles entered the 2018–19 season following a second consecutive semi-disappointing year. While earning the Hockey East regular season title with their strong 20–14–3 record, they missed out on participating in the NCAA Tournament for the second year in a row; the first time missing consecutive years since 1998. Additionally, they failed to secure any mid-season tournament title, placing fourth in both the inaugural Ice Vegas Invitational Tournament and in the Beanpot tournament.

Departures

Three Eagles departed from the program from the 2017–18 roster:

Graduation:
Kevin Lohan, Senior – D

Not Retained:
Mike Booth, Sophomore – F
Casey Carreau, Freshman – F

Additionally, long-time Associate Head Coach Greg Brown left the program to become the Assistant Coach for the New York Rangers of the NHL. Boston College alum and formerly assistant coach at Connecticut, Brendan Buckley was hired to fill the position.

Recruiting
Boston College added five freshmen for the 2018–19 season: four forwards, and one defensemen.

2018–2019 roster

2018–19 Eagles

As of October 8, 2018.

Coaching staff

Standings

Schedule

Regular season

|-
!colspan=12 style="" | Exhibition

|-
!colspan=12 style="" | Regular Season

|-
!colspan=12 style=""| Hockey East Tournament

On November 17, sophomore Jacob Tortora left the program after dressing in just four games on the season.
Freshman Oliver Wahlstrom would miss the January 4 and 5 games against Arizona State, representing the United States at the 2019 World Juniors, where he would help the Americans win the silver medal, falling 3–2 in the gold medal game against Finland.
Defensemen Ben Finklestein was added to the roster on January 11, joining the program as a second-semester Junior. He previously played with the St. Lawrence Saints in the ECAC as well as the Waterloo Black Hawks in the USHL.

Rankings

Statistics

Skaters

Goaltenders

Awards and honors

ACHA/CCM Division I East All-Stars
David Cotton, F – Second Team

Hockey East All-Stars
David Cotton, F – First Team
Casey Fitzgerald, D – Honorable Mention

Hockey East Player of the Month
David Cotton, F – Month of November

Hockey East Goaltender of the Month
Joseph Woll, G – Month of December

Hockey East Player of the Week
David Cotton, F – Week of November 5, 2018
Julius Mattila, F – Week of December 10, 2018
Logan Hutsko, F – Week of March 18, 2019 (Shared with Cale Makar)

Hockey East Rookie of the Week
Oliver Wahlstrom, F – Week of October 8, 2018

Hockey East Defensive Player of the Week
Joseph Woll, G – Week of December 2, 2018 (Shared with Jeremy Swayman)

References

External links
BC Men's Hockey Home Page
BC Men's Hockey Page on USCHO

Boston College Eagles men's ice hockey seasons
Boston College Eagles
Boston College Eagles
Boston College Eagles men's ice hockey season
Boston College Eagles men's ice hockey season
Boston College Eagles men's ice hockey season
Boston College Eagles men's ice hockey season